Henry Robinson was the librarian of the Yorkshire Philosophical Society and secretary from 1837 to 1842.

He resigned as secretary in 1842 and served on the council until 1851.

He lived in Clifton and donated Roman urns and pottery found there in 1841.

Year of birth missing
Year of death missing
People from York
English librarians